Albacete Balompié is a Spanish football team based in Albacete, in the autonomous community of Castile–La Mancha. Founded on 2 August 1940, it currently plays in Segunda División, the second tier of Spanish football, holding home matches at Estadio Carlos Belmonte, with a capacity of 17,524.

History
This team is from Albacete a city in Castilla-La Mancha. It's been reported in at least three sources that football was first taught in Albacete by John Hulse, an English Engineer of the Lancashire and Yorkshire Railways Company, establishing the foundation of Locomotoras Albacete, after the same-named steam locomotive factory in the city, owned by the Goicoechea family, owners of Talgo. Thus, like in Swindon, football in Albacete is originally linked to the railway industry. Hulse introduced the Sheffield Rules in Albacete, and some of the first matches to be reported are against recreational clubs from Murcia (1897), Alcázar de San Juan (1899), and Villarrobledo (1899).

After years of amateur and regional development of football, it would not appear formally until the end of the Spanish Civil War. The club was founded in 1940 under the name Albacete Foot-ball Association, being later changed in an attempt to make it sound "more Spanish". At the  second division in 1985–86, repeating the feat five seasons later.

In 1989, Benito Floro consecutively promoted the club from the third division to La Liga, overachieving for a seventh place in the first season in the top level. Floro would later coach Real Madrid, returning to Alba two seasons later as the club was relegated in 1995–96.

After years in the second division facing serious economic and sporting difficulties, Albacete returned to the top flight in the 2002–03 campaign, led by César Ferrando (later of Atlético Madrid). However, Albacete dropped in 2004–05 after posting just 6 wins from 38 matches, going on to stabilize in the subsequent seasons in the second level.

The 2010–11 season brought two coaching changes, with both Antonio Calderón and David Vidal (who returned to the club only a few months after leaving) being fired, as Albacete returned to the third division after 21 years. That season the club finished last in Segunda División with only 32 points in 42 matches. On 6 December 2011, Andrés Iniesta – who played for the club in his youth before joining Barcelona – became the club's major shareholder, donating €420,000 to the cash-strapped club. The club managed to reach the round of 16 of the 2011–12 Copa del Rey, notably beating Atlético Madrid 3–1 on aggregate.

In March 2013, Agustín Lázaro, chief executive officer (CEO) of Andrés Iniesta's winery enterprise, was appointed as Albacete's chairman. In June, Iniesta loaned the club a further €240,000 to cover unpaid wages, thus preventing its administrative relegation to the fourth tier.

In 2014, Albacete returned to the Segunda División, but was relegated two seasons later after finishing the season in the 21st position. The club again returned to the Segunda División in the 2016–17 season after winning against Valencia Mestalla in the last round of the promotion play-offs. Albacete finished the 2018–19 season in 4th position of the Segunda División, but then lost to RCD Mallorca in the La Liga play-offs and remained in Segunda División for the 2019–20 season. On next season, Albacete finished last in second division and we're relegated to the third division. Thus ending their four-years stay in the second division.

Albacete promoted to Segunda in the 2021–22 Primera RFEF season playoffs, by defeating Deportivo de La Coruña in their home turf. The team came back from a 1–0 deficit, winning 1–2 with an overtime goal.

Seasons

Season to season

7 seasons in La Liga
25 seasons in Segunda División
1 season in Primera División RFEF
11 seasons in Segunda División B
29 seasons in Tercera División
9 seasons in Categorías Regionales

Current squad
The numbers are established according to the official website:  and www.lfp.es

Reserve team

Out on loan

Current technical staff

Honours
Segunda División: (1) 1990–91
Segunda División B: (2) 1989–90, 2013–14, 2016–17
Tercera División: (8) 1945–46, 1946–47, 1948–49, 1958–59, 1960–61, 1963–64, 1964–65, 1981–82
La Liga promotion: (2) 1990–91, 2002–03
Segunda División promotion: (2) 1984–85, 1989–90

Stadium

The club plays its home matches at the Estadio Carlos Belmonte, which has an all-seated capacity of 17,524. Originally built in 1960, the stadium underwent two major redevelopments, the last being in 1998.

International players

 Óscar Dertycia
 Carlos Roa
 Andy Bernal
 Vali Gasimov
 Ronny Gaspercic
 Marco Etcheverry
 Zago
 Ivaylo Andonov
 Albert Meyong
 Mark González
 Danny Carvajal
 Luis Conejo
 Keylor Navas
 Nenad Bjelica
 Ivan Jurić
 Trésor Kandol
 Javier Balboa
 Rachid Rokki
 Moussa Yahaya
 Abass Lawal
 Rommel Fernández
 Nelson Cuevas
 Andrés Iniesta
 Fernando Morientes
 Cătălin Munteanu
 Roman Zozulya
 Joe Bizera
 Darío Delgado
 Nicolás Olivera
 Antonio Pacheco
 Horacio Peralta
 José Luis Zalazar

Famous coaches

 Dagoberto Moll (1960–61)
 Enrique Orizaola (1976–78)
 Máximo Hernández (1979–80)
 Ignacio Bergara (1981–84)
 Julián Rubio (1984–85)
 Pachín (1985–86)
 Pepe Carcelén (1988–89)
 Julián Rubio (1989)
 Benito Floro (1989–92)
 Julián Rubio (1992)
 Ginés Meléndez (interim) (1992)
 Víctor Espárrago (1992–94)
 Luis Suárez (1994)
 Ginés Meléndez (interim) (1994)
 Benito Floro (1994–96)
 Iñaki Sáez (1996)
 Manolo Jiménez (1996)
 Mariano García Remón (1996–97)
 Luis Sánchez Duque (1997)
 Ginés Meléndez (1998)
 Luigi Maifredi (1998–99)
 Julián Rubio (1999–01)
 Paco Herrera (2001–02)
 César Ferrando (2002–04)
 José González (2004–05)
 César Ferrando (2005–07)
 Quique Hernández (2007–08)
 Máximo Hernández (2008)
 Juan Ignacio Martínez (2008–09)
 Máximo Hernández (2009)
 José Murcia (2009)
 Julián Rubio (2009–10)
 David Vidal (2010)
 Antonio Calderón (2010–11)
 David Vidal (2011)
 Mario Simón (2011)
 Antonio Gómez (2011–13)
 Luis César (2013–16)
 César Ferrando (2016)
 José Manuel Aira (2016–17)
 Enrique Martín Monreal (2017–18)
 Luis Miguel Ramis (2018–20)
 Lucas Alcaraz (2020)
 Aritz López Garai (2020–)

See also
Atlético Albacete, Albacete Balompié's reserve team
Fundación Albacete, Albacete Balompié's women's team.
Albacete FS, a futsal club from the same city.

References

External links
Official website 
Futbolme team profile 

 
Football clubs in Castilla–La Mancha
Association football clubs established in 1940
1940 establishments in Spain
Segunda División clubs
Railway association football teams
La Liga clubs
Primera Federación clubs
Sport in Albacete
Football clubs in Spain